Camorta (Kamorta) is a Nicobarese language spoken in the central Nicobar Islands. It is not mutually intelligible with the other Central Nicobarese languages.

It is considered by Ethnologue as a dialect of the Central Nicobarese language.

References

Languages of India

Nicobarese languages